Socalchemmis is a genus of North American false wolf spiders that was first described by Norman I. Platnick & D. Ubick in 2001. The genus name comes from a shortening of the phrase "Southern Californian Chemmis", as the genus was discovered in California.

Species
 it contains seventeen species, found in Mexico and the United States:
Socalchemmis arroyoseco Platnick & Ubick, 2007 – USA
Socalchemmis bixleri Platnick & Ubick, 2001 – USA
Socalchemmis cajalco Platnick & Ubick, 2001 – USA
Socalchemmis catavina Platnick & Ubick, 2001 – Mexico
Socalchemmis cruz Platnick & Ubick, 2001 – USA
Socalchemmis dolichopus (Chamberlin, 1919) (type) – USA
Socalchemmis gertschi Platnick & Ubick, 2001 – USA
Socalchemmis icenoglei Platnick & Ubick, 2001 – USA
Socalchemmis idyllwild Platnick & Ubick, 2001 – USA
Socalchemmis kastoni Platnick & Ubick, 2001 – USA, Mexico
Socalchemmis miramar Platnick & Ubick, 2001 – USA
Socalchemmis monterey Platnick & Ubick, 2001 – USA
Socalchemmis palomar Platnick & Ubick, 2001 – USA
Socalchemmis prenticei Platnick & Ubick, 2001 – USA
Socalchemmis rothi Platnick & Ubick, 2001 – Mexico
Socalchemmis shantzi Platnick & Ubick, 2001 – USA
Socalchemmis williamsi Platnick & Ubick, 2001 – Mexico

See also
 List of Zoropsidae species

References

Araneomorphae genera
Spiders of Mexico
Spiders of the United States
Zoropsidae